Dhanith Sri (born 22 December 1994) is a Sri Lankan singer, composer and songwriter. He is considered one of the most popular artists in Sri Lanka. Dhanith entered the mainstream music industry with his 2018 hit "Pandama". The alternative rock feel of this song is complemented by his high-pitched vocals as well as the mix of Sri Lankan traditional drum beats and synthesizers. It became number one on TV and radio charts concurrently.

Biography 
Dhanith Sri was born on 22 December 1994 in Kandy, Sri Lanka. He was educated at Vidyartha College, Kandy and Kingswood College, Kandy. He graduated from University of Peradeniya with a specialised degree in electrical and electronic engineering.

Career 
Dhanith released singles such as "Jeewithe" and "Obe As" when he was a teenager and was also a dancer, a talent he showcased in his music videos back in the day. Dhanith has also been featured in other singles such as "Lakmawuni", alongside various local artists in a tribute to the victims of the Easter Sunday tragedy and Sebala Puthu with Bathiya and Santhush. And also Dumal Warnakulasuriya. Crew member of Nadagama. Theme song of Dam (දාම්) was sung by Dhanith.

Discography

References

External links 

 DHANITH SRI - Pandama (පන්දම) Official Music Video
DHANITH SRI - Sandaganawa (සඳගනාව) Official Music Video
ධනිත් ශ්‍රී ආදරණීය ජෝතිගේ ගීතයක් රහට ගයයි | Dhanith Sri EP 01
රයිගම් සම්මාන උළෙලට ආව හැමෝවම පිස්සු වට්ටපු රවී සහ දනිත් ශ්‍රී..

1994 births
Living people
21st-century Sri Lankan male singers
Sri Lankan composers
Sinhalese singers
Musicians from Kandy